The 2023 La Drôme Classic, officially the Faun Drôme Classic due to sponsorships, was the 10th edition of the Drôme Classic cycle race. It was held on 26 February 2022 as a category 1.Pro race on the 2023 UCI ProSeries. The race started and finished in Étoile-sur-Rhône and featured several climbs throughout. It formed a pair of races on the same weekend with the 2023 Faun-Ardèche Classic, held on the previous day.

Teams 
Thirteen of the eighteen UCI WorldTeams, six UCI ProTeams, and two UCI Continental teams made up the twenty-one teams that participated in the race, with a total of 147 riders, of which 72 finished the race.

UCI WorldTeams

 
 
 
 
 
 
 
 
 
 
 
 
 

UCI ProTeams

 
 
 
 
 
 

UCI Continental Teams

Result

References

External links 
 

La Drôme Classic
La Drôme Classic
2023
La Drôme Classic